Jacob Siaosiselaginato Tuioti-Mariner (born July 25, 1996) is an American football defensive end who is a free agent. He played college football at UCLA.

Early years
Born in Corona, California to a Samoan American family, Tuioti-Mariner attended St. John Bosco High School in Bellflower, California.

As a senior, he contributed to the team winning the CIF Pac-5 Division championship and the CIF state championship Open Division bowl game.

Professional career

Atlanta Falcons

2018 season
Tuioti-Mariner was signed by the Atlanta Falcons as an undrafted free agent on May 3, 2018. He was waived on September 1, 2018, and was signed to the practice squad the next day. He signed a reserve/future contract on December 31, 2018.

2019 season
On August 31, 2019, Tuioti-Mariner was waived by the Falcons and signed to the practice squad the next day. He was promoted to the active roster on November 4, 2019.

2020 season
In Week 12 of the 2020 Season against the Las Vegas Raiders, Tuioti-Mariner recovered a fumble forced by teammate Foyesade Oluokun on Derek Carr and later recorded a strip sack on Carr that he recovered himself during the 43–6 win.
Tuioti-Mariner was named the NFC Defensive Player of the Week for his performance in Week 12.

2021 season

Tuioti-Mariner signed a contract extension with the Falcons on March 11, 2021. He was waived on November 9, 2021.

Pittsburgh Steelers
On November 11, 2021, Tuioti-Mariner signed with the Pittsburgh Steelers practice squad.

Carolina Panthers
On January 5, 2022, Tuioti-Mariner was signed by the Carolina Panthers off the Steelers practice squad. He was placed on injured reserve on August 11, 2022. He was released on August 16.

Personal life
Tuioti-Mariner's cousin, A. J. Epenesa, is also a professional football player. His father played professional volleyball and rugby. Tuioti-Mariner has six siblings.

References

External links
 
 Carolina Panthers bio
 UCLA Bruins bio

1996 births
Living people
American football defensive tackles
American football defensive ends
Atlanta Falcons players
Players of American football from California
Sportspeople from Corona, California
UCLA Bruins football players
American sportspeople of Samoan descent
Pittsburgh Steelers players
Carolina Panthers players